Calliostoma fernandesi, is a species of sea snail, a marine gastropod mollusk in the family Calliostomatidae.

Description

Distribution
This species occurs in the Atlantic Ocean off the Cape Verde Archipelago.

References

 Rolán E. & Monteiro A. 2006. A new Calliostoma (Mollusca, Calliostomatidae) from the Cape Verde Archipelago. Gloria Maris 45(5): 115–121.
 Bouchet, P.; Fontaine, B. (2009). List of new marine species described between 2002–2006. Census of Marine Life

fernandesi
Gastropods described in 2006
Gastropods of Cape Verde